The 2010 IIHF University Challenge Cup of Asia was the first playing of the university section of the IIHF Challenge Cup of Asia. It was held from May 12 to May 14, 2010, in Seoul, South Korea. Japan won the tournament after winning both of their games and finishing on top of the standings.

Overview
The 2010 IIHF University Challenge Cup of Asia began on May 12, 2010 in Seoul, South Korea. The first game was played between hosts South Korea and China with South Korea winning the game 4–3. Japan won the tournament after winning both their games against China and South Korea. South Korea finished second with three points while China finished third after losing both of their games. Young June Lee of South Korea was named the tournaments best forward, Li Jian of China the tournaments best defenceman and Sung Je Park of South Korea the best goaltender.

Standings

Fixtures

References

External links
International Ice Hockey Federation

Uni
2010 University
International ice hockey competitions hosted by South Korea
Asian ice hockey competitions for junior teams